Karlo Bručić (born 17 April 1992) is a Croatian professional footballer who plays as a left back for Liga I club CFR Cluj.

Club career
A product of the GNK Dinamo Zagreb football academy, he was initially loaned to Radnik Sesvete for a season and has been constantly on loan to NK Lokomotiva since early 2012.  He made his Prva HNL debut on 4 March 2012 against Rijeka. He made 7 league appearances that season and more than 20 the next season.

In September 2014, he switched from a loan to a full contract to NK Lokomotiva. During his spell at the club, he made 131 appearances and scored seven goals. On 2 July 2016, he switched to Israeli club Ashdod.

On 9 February 2019, Transferred to Japanese club Sagan Tosu. From September 2019 he is a member of lithuanian FK Sūduva Marijampolė.

International career
He has been capped at Croatia youth levels.

Honours
Lokomotiva Zagreb
Croatian Cup runner-up: 2012–13

Sūduva
A Lyga: 2019
Lithuanian Cup: 2019

Koper
Slovenian Cup: 2021–22

CFR Cluj
Supercupa României runner-up: 2022

References

External links

1992 births
Living people
Footballers from Zagreb
Association football fullbacks
Croatian footballers
Croatia youth international footballers
Croatia under-21 international footballers
GNK Dinamo Zagreb players
NK Sesvete players
NK Lokomotiva Zagreb players
F.C. Ashdod players
Sagan Tosu players
FK Sūduva Marijampolė players
FC Dinamo Minsk players
Apollon Smyrnis F.C. players
FC Koper players
CFR Cluj players
Croatian Football League players
Israeli Premier League players
J1 League players
A Lyga players
Belarusian Premier League players
Super League Greece players
Slovenian PrvaLiga players
Croatian expatriate footballers
Expatriate footballers in Israel
Expatriate footballers in Japan
Expatriate footballers in Lithuania
Expatriate footballers in Belarus
Expatriate footballers in Greece
Expatriate footballers in Slovenia
Expatriate footballers in Romania
Croatian expatriate sportspeople in Israel
Croatian expatriate sportspeople in Japan
Croatian expatriate sportspeople in Lithuania
Croatian expatriate sportspeople in Belarus
Croatian expatriate sportspeople in Greece
Croatian expatriate sportspeople in Slovenia